Little Egypt is a 1951 American Technicolor comedy drama film directed by Frederick de Cordova starring Mark Stevens and Rhonda Fleming. It is a highly fictionalised biography of the dancer Little Egypt in the 1890s.

Plot
Looking to bring back authentic Egyptians for his exhibit at the Chicago World's Fair, Cyrus Graydon goes to Cairo, where he is joined by a pasha and by an American con artist  named Wayne Cravat.

A look or two at the exotic dancer Izora and the pasha's in love. Graydon tries to discourage her, but she manages to make her way to Chicago, where she promptly identifies herself, to Cravat's delight, as a genuine Egyptian princess.

Cravat pretends to be romantically interested in Graydon's daughter, Sylvia, to score points with her father. A jealous Izora retaliates by trying to seduce the man Sylvia is engaged to, Oliver Doane.

When she dances a scandalous "hootchy-kootchy" dance in public, the police place Izora under arrest. She insists in court that as a princess she's entitled to dance any way she pleases. Trouble is, the prosecution has discovered that Izora is actually Betty Randolph of Jersey City, New Jersey.

The pasha shows up just in time to attest to the fact that she is his cousin ... and, therefore, a true princess. They nearly get away with it, until others figure out that the pasha himself is nothing but a fake.

Cast
 Mark Stevens as Wayne Cravat
 Rhonda Fleming as Izora
 Nancy Guild as Sylvia Graydon
 Charles Drake as Oliver Doane
 Tom D'Andrea as Max
 Minor Watson as Cyrus Graydon
 Steven Geray as Pasha
 Verna Felton as Mrs. Samantha Doane
 John Litel as Shuster
 Kathryn Givney as Cynthia Graydon
 Fritz Feld as Professor
 Dan Riss as Prosecutor
 Jack George as Meheddi
 Edward Clark as Judge (as Ed Clark)
 John Gallaudet as O'Reilly 
 Freeman Lusk as Spinelli
 Leon Belasco as Moulai

Production
The film was announced in October 1950. Filming started late November 1950.

De Cordova later said he only enjoyed making the film "a modicum. At least the picture got me back in the musical area where I had worked in New York. Mark Stevens was an attractive, competent actor and Rhonda Fleming was a very pretty girl. We tested a lot of women for that part. Whoever played it had to be voluptuous and able to move sexily. The picture was kind of a pot boiler but we got paid for it. The results weren't terrible although I don't think I heightened Fleming's career or that the picture heightened mine."

References

External links

1951 films
American historical comedy-drama films
1950s historical comedy-drama films
Films set in Chicago
Films set in Cairo
Films set in the 1890s
Universal Pictures films
Films directed by Frederick de Cordova
1950s English-language films
1950s American films